Valeriy Fedoruk (born 5 February 1983 in Krasnodon) is a Ukrainian professional squash player. As of September 2021, he was ranked number 202 in the world, and number 1 in Ukraine.

References

1983 births
Living people
People from Krasnodon
Ukrainian male squash players
Sportspeople from Luhansk Oblast
Competitors at the 2022 World Games